Fritz Vogelgsang (1 March 1930 in Stuttgart – 22 October 2009 in Chiva de Morella) was a German translator, essayist and editor.

He translated into German the work of various important Spanish-language writers: Rafael Alberti, Ramón del Valle Inclán, Antonio Machado, Octavio Paz, Pablo Neruda, Juan Ramón Jiménez, Miguel Ángel Asturias, etc.

Honors
 Literaturpreis der Stadt Stuttgart (1978)
 Christoph-Martin-Wieland-Übersetzerpreis (1979)
 Premio Nacional de Formento de la Traducción de Autores Espanoles  (1984)
 Premi de Literatura Catalana (1985)
 Johann-Heinrich-Voß-Preis für Übersetzung (1991)
 Wilhelm-Merton-Preis für europäische Übersetzungen (2001)
 Preis der Leipziger Buchmesse (2008)

References

External links
 Nachruf auf Fritz Vogelgsang in der "Frankfurter Rundschau"
 
 

1930 births
2009 deaths
Writers from Stuttgart
Spanish–German translators
German essayists
German male essayists
20th-century German translators
20th-century essayists
20th-century German male writers
Stuttgarter Zeitung people